Pilish is a style of constrained writing in which the lengths of consecutive words or sentences match the digits of the number  (pi).  The shortest example is any three-letter word, such as "pie", but many longer examples have been constructed, including sentences, poems, and stories.

Examples 

The following sentence is an example which matches the first fifteen digits of :

How I need a drink, alcoholic of course, after the heavy lectures involving quantum mechanics!

The following Pilish poem (written by Joseph Shipley) matches the first 31 digits of π:

But a time I spent wandering in bloomy night;
Yon tower, tinkling chimewise, loftily opportune.
Out, up, and together came sudden to Sunday rite,
The one solemnly off to correct plenilune.

A full-length Pilish novel has been published, which currently holds the record of the longest Pilish text with 10,000 digits.

Rule sets
In order to deal with occurrences of the digit zero, the following rule set was introduced (referred to as Basic Pilish):

In Basic Pilish, each word of n letters represents
(1) The digit n if n < 10
(2) The digit 0 if n = 10

Since long runs of small non-zero digits are difficult to deal with naturally (such as 1121 or 1111211), another rule set called Standard Pilish was introduced:

In Standard Pilish, each word of n letters represents
(1) The digit n if n < 10
(2) The digit 0 if n = 10
(3) Two consecutive digits if n > 10
(for example, a 12-letter word, such as "sleepwalking," represents the digits 1,2)

See also
 Cadaeic Cadenza
 Constrained writing

References

2. Walkowicz, Nathan (2021) Stile: “An Infinite Mystery” Kindle Direct Publishing. ISBN-13 979-8485105631

External links
Writing in Pilish
Pilish Checker
Accidental Pilish

Constrained writing
Pi